The Carnegie Public Library (Boise, Idaho) is a Neoclassical building designed by Tourtellotte & Co. and constructed in Boise, Idaho, in 1904–1905.  It was individually listed on the National Register of Historic Places in 1974. In 1982 it was included as a contributing property in the Fort Street Historic District.

History
The Boise Public Library began in 1895 when members of the Columbian Club opened a subscription library and reading room in Boise City Hall. When Boise received a grant in 1904 to build a Carnegie library, local architects John Tourtellotte and Charles Hummel won the design contract, and the local firm of Michels & Weber received the construction contract. Materials included white brick fired in Boise and sandstone from nearby Table Rock. Boise's Carnegie Library opened June 22, 1905, and Mary F. Wood became its first librarian.

In 1973 the Boise Public Library moved to a larger building, formerly occupied by Salt Lake Hardware, at 715 S. Capitol Blvd., and in 1974 the Carnegie Library was added to the National Register of Historic Places.

The building was occupied by a law firm until 2018 when it was repurposed for artists as studio space.

See also
List of Carnegie libraries in Idaho

References

External links

Further reading
 Boise, Frank E. Aden, Jr., (Arcadia Publishing, 2015), pg. 86
 Boise, Frank Thomason, (Arcadia Publishing, 2009), pg. 102

Library buildings completed in 1905
Buildings and structures in Boise, Idaho
Neoclassical architecture in Idaho
National Register of Historic Places in Ada County, Idaho
Libraries on the National Register of Historic Places in Idaho
Carnegie libraries in Idaho
Individually listed contributing properties to historic districts on the National Register in Idaho
1905 establishments in Idaho